Daylight Limited could refer to:
the Daylight Limited, a passenger train in New Zealand
the Daylight Limited (Monon train), a passenger train of the Monon Railroad
the Coast Daylight (SP train), a passenger train of the Southern Pacific